Roland Stuart Andrews CMG DSc FAA, (20 September 1897 (Granville, Sydney) – 14 October 1961 (Glen Iris, Melbourne)), was an industrial chemist and administrator.

References

Fellows of the Australian Academy of Science
Australian Companions of the Order of St Michael and St George
1897 births
1961 deaths
Australian chemists
Scientists from Sydney
University of Sydney alumni
People educated at Sydney Technical High School